The T-AB-1 or MAP NM T-AB-1 (Mina Anti-Pessoal Nāo-Magnética) is a small, cylindrical, fully waterproof and shock-resistant Brazilian minimum metal anti-personnel mine. The mine is normally olive green in color, and uses the AC Min NM AE T-AB-1 pressure fuze. It is no longer in production, ceased in 1989, and all operational stocks have been destroyed. The mine is operational in Ecuador and Libya.

This mine was used as the initiator for the T-AB-1 anti-tank mine.

A grey practice version of the mine is also produced.

Specifications
 Diameter: 60 mm
 Height: 61 mm
 Weight: 125 g
 Explosive content: 62 g of Pentolite
 Operating pressure: 18 kg

References
 Jane's Mines and Mine Clearance 2005-2006
 Brassey's Essential Guide to Anti-Personnel Landmines, Eddie Banks
 
 Wired: Gadhafi leaves mines behind for rebels

Anti-personnel mines
Land mines of Brazil